Rolled/Oats is a single released by Lemon Jelly, and their second limited edition release (their first was "Soft/Rock").

The 7" single, featuring remixes of tracks from the Lost Horizons album, was limited to 1,200 copies and released as a gold picture disc, each coming in its own hand-stitched hessian sleeve. The A-side, "Rolled", is a remix of "The Curse of Ka'Zar" and features a sample from "Feel Like Makin' Love" by Bad Company, while  the b-side, "Oats", is a remix of "Closer" and features a sample from George Michael's "Heal the Pain".

Track listings
 "Rolled" - 3:55
 "Oats" - 5:06

Lemon Jelly songs
2003 singles
XL Recordings singles
2003 songs